Mike (Michael) Edmunds is a British astrophysicist, known for his research on the interpretation of the chemical composition of the Universe and the origin of interstellar dust.

Education
He received his undergraduate degree and his doctorate from the University of Cambridge.

Career
He has lived and worked in Wales for over 35 years. He is an Emeritus Professor and former Head of the School of Physics and Astronomy at Cardiff University in Wales. He has served on many committees and panels of the UK Research Councils, The Royal Astronomical Society and the Institute of Physics. He was formerly a member of the Particle Physics and Astronomy Research Council.

Research
His main areas of research have been in the determination and interpretation of the chemical composition of galaxies and the Universe. He has also worked on the origin of interstellar dust. In later years, he has focused on the history of astronomy and science within society.

Antikythera Mechanism Research Project
He heads the Antikythera Mechanism Research Project: an international collaboration investigating the extraordinary astronomical machine dating from around the 200 BC, discovered by sponge divers over a century ago, off the Greek island of Antikythera.

References

21st-century British astronomers
Living people
Year of birth missing (living people)
Alumni of the University of Cambridge
Academics of Cardiff University
20th-century British astronomers